Jake Matthews may refer to:

 Jake Matthews (fighter) (born 1994), Australian mixed martial artist
 Jake Matthews (American football) (born 1992), American football offensive tackle

See also
 Jake Mathews (born 1971), Canadian country music singer, songwriter and performer